United States national bandy team has been taking part in the Bandy World Championships since 1985, being the first nation to join apart from the four teams which had so far participated in almost all the world championships; the Soviet Union, Sweden, Finland and Norway. However, the American team has yet to make it to the championship medals.

America also plays Canada in the annual Can-Am Bandy Cup.

World Championship record

References

External links
American Bandy Association Official Homepage
New York Times article

Bandy in the United States
National bandy teams
Bandy